Verjuice (from Middle French vertjus 'green juice') is a highly acidic juice made by pressing unripe grapes, crab-apples or other sour fruit. Sometimes lemon or sorrel juice, herbs or spices are added to change the flavour. In the Middle Ages, it was widely used all over Western Europe as an ingredient in sauces, as a condiment, or to deglaze preparations. It is still used to some extent in the American South.

It was once used in many contexts where modern cooks would use either wine or some variety of vinegar, but has become much less widely used as wines and variously flavoured vinegars became more accessible.  Nonetheless, it is still used in a number of French dishes as well as recipes from other European and Middle Eastern cuisines, and can be purchased at some gourmet grocery stores. The South Australian cook Maggie Beer has popularised the use of verjuice in her cooking and it is being used increasingly in South Australian restaurants.

Modern cooks use verjuice most often in salad dressings as the acidic ingredient when wine is going to be served with the salad. This is because it provides a comparable sour taste component, yet without "competing with" (altering the taste of) the wine, the way vinegar or lemon juice would.

Called husroum (حصرم) in Arabic, it is used extensively in Lebanese and Syrian cuisine. Known as ab-ghooreh (آب‌غوره) in Persian, it is used extensively in Persian cuisine, such as in Shirazi salad.

Modern resurgence
Maggie Beer, an Australian cook, vintner and food writer, began the modern resurgence of verjuice when she started commercial production in 1984, after a harvest of Rhine Riesling grapes could not be sold. She persuaded a winemaker who was a friend to assist her in turning the juice into verjuice. After slow national sales, 15 years later came international sales, that were then followed in France and elsewhere by local product.

Niagara Oast House Brewers in Niagara-on-the-Lake, Ontario, developed a farmhouse ale around the use of local Niagara Pinot Noir Verjus with the first release in fall 2015.

Other uses of the word verjus

The authors of The Medieval Kitchen: Recipes from France and Italy write that the grape seeds preserved in salts were also called verjus during the Middle Ages.

In the French region of Ardèche, a cider fermented from crab apple juice is called verjus. In medieval and early modern English cookery texts "verjuice" sometimes means apple juice or crab-apple juice.

References

Further reading

The Medieval Kitchen: Recipes from France and Italy, by Odile Redon, Françoise Sabban and Silvano Serventi, University Of Chicago Press, 2000.  (hardcover);  (paperback)

External links

French cuisine
Medieval cuisine
Condiments
Sour foods